Jet Packs is a sci-fi themed aerial carousel attraction in Tomorrowland in Shanghai Disneyland, and opened along with the rest of the park on June 16, 2016.

Ride experience 
Similar to other aerial carousels, such as the Astro Orbiter, guests board two person ride-vehicles and spin around in one of the 16 large metallic spheres. Guests are able to control how high their vehicle goes with jetpack-esque joystick buttons at their sides. The higher guests choose to go, the more their vehicle rotates forward. The ride's vehicles are floorless with rider's legs dangling, further emphasizing the feeling of flying with a jetpack.

From their high vantage point, riders get an aerial view of Tomorrowland and the rest of Shanghai Disneyland. At the center of the attraction, a large energy sphere spins faster as the ride progresses.

References

Shanghai Disneyland
Amusement rides introduced in 2016
Tomorrowland